Conrad von Pyhy (died 1553) was a Swedish statesman of German descent, originally from Frankfurt am Main. He served as Lord High Chancellor of Sweden from 1538 to 1543. He fell in disgrace in 1543 and was imprisoned at Västerås Castle, where he died in 1553.

References

16th-century Swedish politicians
Swedish nobility
Swedish people of German descent
People from Frankfurt
1553 deaths
Year of birth unknown
Swedish Reformation